The following radio stations broadcast on AM frequency 850 kHz: 850 AM is a United States clear-channel frequency. KOA and KICY share Class A status of 850 kHz.

In Argentina 
 La Gauchita in Morón, Buenos Aires

In Mexico 
  in Jalpan De Serra, Queretaro
  in Mexicali, Baja California

In the United States 
Stations in bold are clear-channel stations.

In Uruguay 
 CX 16 Radio Carve in Montevideo

References

Lists of radio stations by frequency